The Jełowicki family, sometimes called Jałowiecki, (feminine form: Jełowicka, plural: Jełowiccy) is a Polish princely family of Ruthenian-Lithuanian origin, bearing the Jełowicki arms. They use the prefix Bożeniec. Their estates were originally in Volhynia to the east of the Kingdom of Poland.  As Ruthenian nobility, they held the title of kniaz (prince). By the late 16th century, the family converted from Orthodox to Catholicism and became polonized. They eventually left their original settlements at Jałowicze/Jełowicze and Bożeniec. Following their victorious exploits against the invading Tartars King Casimir IV Jagiellon rewarded them in 1444 with the domain of Łanowce in present day Ukraine. They remained on the same land from father to son from 1444 to 1865. Across the centuries, the family produced many civic officials, Prelates and clergy. They are related to other notable houses in the region, including Czartoryski, Rzewuski and Ostrogski.  The family is possibly the supposedly "extinct" branch of the Kropotkin family.

History

Etymology of the name 
Jełowicki stems from the place name Jałowicze, Jałowicz or Jełowicze, (ukr. Яловичі), in Rivne Oblast, where they were on the Lithuanian record since 1528.

Princely title 
Kasper Niesiecki SJ, the historian and genealogist, regards the family as descendants of the princes of Pereiaslav, and Józef Jabłonowski declares Izaslav prince of Pereiaslav to be their ancestor. According to another source, Adam Kosiński, the Jelowicki are likely descendants of the Kropotka Jełowicki family branch which apparently went extinct in the 16th-c. He argues this since their principal domain was Jalowicze/Jełowicz, and they used the Jełowicki seal indicating their origin as from Jełowicz. Moreover, on 28 February 1841 a decree of a special commission of certification granted the family the right to princely status confirmed by the Russian heraldic office in Saint Petersburg.

Podolia Branch 

At the start of the 18th-century a branch of the family moved to Podolia to land in the Bratslav Voivodeship in the Vinnytsia Oblast where their huge estate was devoted to cereal production and prospered further with the opening and development of the port of Odessa from 1794.

Stefan Jełowicki married to an Iwankiewicz, became through her, heir to Antoni Jaroszyński and his property at Siennica in Mińsk Mazowiecki powiat.

In 1830 the Jełowicki of Podolia demonstrated their patriotism in the November Uprising. Wacław Jełowicki and his three sons Edward, Aleksander and Eustachy joined the battle in May 1831 but Waclaw momentarily separated from his sons was felled by a bullet.

Notable family members
 Paszko Bożeniec Jełowicki (†1450) - vanquished the Tatars under Casimir IV Jagiellon
 Iwan Bożeniec Jełowicki (†1550)
 Gniewosz Bożeniec Jełowicki (†1565) - official to Sigismund II Augustus
 Sawa Bożeniec Jełowicki (†1590) - builder of Łanowce castle
 Zachariasz Jełowicki (†1629) – secretary to Sigismund III Vasa
 Józef Bożeniec Jełowicki (1667-1708) - Master of the hunt Volhynia
 Hieronim Jełowicki (1672–1732) – bishop
 Antonina Niemiryczowa (1702–1780), late baroque poet
 Stanisław Serwacy Jełowicki (1742–1811) – delegate to the Great Sejm
 Wacław Jełowicki (1778–1831) – landowner, insurgent
 Edward Jełowicki (1803–1848) – insurgent, colonel and inventor Virtuti Militari.
 Aleksander Jełowicki (1804–1877) – poet, publisher, priest Virtuti Militari
 Eustachy Jełowicki (1805–1869) – landowner, insurgent
 Teodor Jełowicki (1828-1905) - lawyer, musician, philanthropist
 Adolf Jełowicki (1840–1898) – philosopher
 Pelagia Popławska, née Jełowicka (1853–1915) – medical doctor, social activist
 Adolf Józef Jełowicki (1863–1937) – bishop, writer
 Witold Jełowicki (1874–1927) – judge
 Gustaw Jełowicki (1880–1965) – priest
 Tadeusz Stanisław Jełowicki (1897-1972) – army major, Virtuti Militari
 Jerzy Jełowicki (1899-1939) -  agronomist, painter, Virtuti Militari
 Jerzy Karol Jełowicki (1941–2006) – membre du Conseil des Polonais of Belgium

Coat of arms variants

Family tree
The Jełowicki family tree is geographically based and draws on the Żychliński text.

Gniewosz Jełowicki (d. 1565), had four sons. Antoni, the second son began the Milczańsko-Kamieniecka line. The third son, Sawa, began the Łanowiecka line.

Sawa's sons were Hieronim, Adrian and Krzysztof. Hieronim, Castellan of Chełm died without issue. 

Adrian, began the Ożenin line, which split into the Ożenin and Mirohoska lines. The Ożenin line further split into the Ożenin-Arentowska line and the Ożenin-Mychlińska Line. The Mirohowski line split further into the Hranowska and Miroboska branches.

Krzysztof began the Łanowiecka line, which remained on the original ancestral land. After the princess Sokulska dowry, it split into two further branches, the Sokulska and Lanowiecka branches. The Sokulska branch died out without male heirs.

The Łanowiecka line produced three brothers, Konstanty Stefan and Wacław. Wacław who died in the battle of Danow was the father of the executed Edward, of Aleksander and Eustachy Jełowicki. Descendants of Edward and Eustachy live in Poland and in the United Kingdom.

See also
 Kropotkin family
 Polish nobility
 Lithuanian nobility
 Ruthenian nobility
 Szlachta

References

Bibliography
Tomkiewicz W. Brzozowski Maksymilian, herbu własnego (†1659) Polski Słownik Biograficzny. — Kraków, 1937. — T. III/1, zeszyt 11. — p. 66. (1989) ISBN 83-04-03291-0

External links
 Jełowicki in the Encyclopedia of Ukraine (1993).

Noble families